Prince Ferdinand of Bourbon-Two Sicilies, Duke of Castro (Ferdinando Maria Andrea Alfonso Marcus; 28 May 1926 – 20 March 2008) was a claimant to the headship of the former Royal House of the Two Sicilies.

Biography

Ferdinand was born in Podzamcze, the son of Prince Ranieri, Duke of Castro, and his wife Countess Maria Carolina Zamoyska. His parents were first cousins, as his grandmothers were sisters. His paternal grandparents were also first cousins. He lived most of his life in France and was the first member of the Two Sicilian royal family to serve in the French Armed Forces.

Ferdinand succeeded as head of the House of the Bourbon-Two Sicilies on his father's death in 1973, having carried out the functions associated with the headship of the family since 1966.  He was Sovereign of the Sacred Military Constantinian Order of Saint George and of the Royal Order of Francis I. He was decorated with several dynastic and state orders.

Ferdinand died in France on 20 March 2008.

Marriage and children
Ferdinand was married in Giez on 23 July 1949 to Chantal de Chevron-Villette (1925–2005), and they had three children:

Princess Béatrice (born 16 June 1950 in Saint-Raphaël), who married Prince Charles Bonaparte on 19 December 1978 in Paris and has issue; divorced in 1989
Princess Caroline Bonaparte (born 24 October 1980) married Eric Alain Marie Quérénet-Onfroy de Bréville (born 28 June 1971) on 27 September 2009 in Castellabate nel Cilento, Italy; and has issue
Prince Jean-Christophe Bonaparte, The Prince Napoléon (born 11 July 1986)
Princess Anne (born 24 April 1957 in Saint-Raphaël) married Baron Jacques Cochin on 9 September 1977 in Roquebrunne-sur-Argens, and has issue; divorced
Prince Carlo, Duke of Castro (born 24 February 1963 in Saint-Raphaël) married Camilla Crociani on 31 October 1998 in Monte Carlo
Princess Maria Carolina of Bourbon-Two Sicilies, The Duchess of Calabria (born 23 June 2003)
Princess Maria Chiara of Bourbon-Two Sicilies, The Duchess of Noto (born 1 January 2005)

Honours
  Sovereign Military Order of Malta: Bailiff Knight Grand Cross of Obedience of the Sovereign Military Order of Malta, 1st Class
 : Grand Cross of the Order of Vasco Núñez de Balboa, Special Class

Ancestry

References

External links
Royal House of Bourbon-Two Sicilies

See also

1926 births
2008 deaths
Pretenders to the throne of the Kingdom of the Two Sicilies
Princes of Bourbon-Two Sicilies
Ferdinand
Ferdinand
People from Garwolin County
French people of Polish descent
19th-century Roman Catholics
20th-century Roman Catholics
Polish Roman Catholics
French Roman Catholics
Italian Roman Catholics
Burials at the Basilica of Santa Chiara